Edward Weller (1 July 1819 – May 1884) FRGS was a British engraver and cartographer who was one of the first to produce maps using lithography.

He was a "London-based engraver, cartographer and publisher, working from offices in Red Lion Square and later, Bloomsbury", who produced detailed steel plate engraved maps.

References

External links

British cartographers
1819 births
1884 deaths
Fellows of the Royal Geographical Society